Antonia Mercé y Luque (September 4, 1890 – July 18, 1936), largely known by her stage name, La Argentina, was an Argentine-born Spanish dancer known for her creation of the neoclassical style of Spanish dance. Considered one of the most famous Spanish dancers of the 20th century, she was known as the "Queen of the Castanets" and the "Flamenco Pavlova."

She was one of the major influences on Japanese butoh dancer, Kazuo Ohno.

Biography

Early life 

La Argentina was born in Buenos Aires, Argentina, to Manuel Mercé, an Andalusian, and Josefina Luque, a Castilian. Both of her parents were professional Spanish dancers and assisted in her dancing career. She studied ballet with her parents in her youth and primarily trained with her father, who taught her to dance at the age of four. When she was nine years old, she debuted at the Teatro Real in Madrid, Spain. At the age of 11, she was a star dancer at the Madrid Opera.

Shortly after the death of her father, La Argentina retired from ballet. At the age of 14, she started studying native Spanish dances with her mother.

Career 

For several years, her style of dancing was thought poorly of in her society and she could not perform in theatres or in concerts (in which she was used to dancing). She danced wherever she could, which meant performing in café cantantés and music halls.

Prior to World War I, La Argentina accepted invitations to Paris, where she danced at the Moulin Rouge, the Théâtre des Champs-Élysées, and other important locations. Years later, she took an interest in a Romani-style dance and made it her own. It was this style that in 1935 led the Metropolitan Opera star Rosa Ponselle to prepare the dances in her portrayal of Bizet’s “Carmen” under the tutelage of “La Argentina.”

In her career, she made six transcontinental tours in North America, sometimes accompanied by flamenco guitarist Carlos Montoya.

Death 
She died on July 18, 1936, in Bayonne, France, 46 years old.

Awards
She received the French Légion d'honneur and the Spanish Orden de Isabel la Católica. A commemorative plaque was placed in the Metropolitan Opera house following her death, and she was also awarded the medal of Alfonso X the Wise.

Contribution to formal dance 
Her contributions to formal dance are expressed in her style, her choice of music, her use of castanets, and her structuring of performances.

Style 
"For the past year, I have had a passion for Argentina. The rigor of her classical formation, her knowledge, and her taste bring dignity and nobleness to Spanish folklore and fills me with respect. I feel like I am entering the Escurial when I am with her." (Edwige Feuillère)

"While there had always been a great flowering of folkloric dances in Spain, the history of formal dance itself began only in 1920 with Argentina and Vicente Escudero. Diaghilev admired them a lot." (Serge Lifar)

La Argentina created her own style. Spain has 49 provinces with very different traditions, which were forgotten as society changed. La Argentina revived the folklore, cataloged it, and sought traditional steps wherever she could find them in village squares and in humble dance schools. She used diplomacy and even subterfuge to be shown a particular step or dance by the elders, that occurred near Salamanca, where she was able to reconstitute the genuine charreada. She felt strongly that what was presented under that name on stage was not authentic. In denying its popular ancestral roots, Spanish dance in the theatre had become insipid.

Parallel with this search for authenticity, she systematically made the dances she found conform to her own aesthetic. She married the purity of classical style with the ardor and character of popular art. No element, musical or plastic, escaped her labor of re-creation. She devoted more than eight hours a day to it, submitting each pattern of steps to her sense of rhythm and music. She refined and pruned, keeping only what was essential. Thanks to her, Spanish formal dance went into a new phase and rose to a hitherto unattained level of sublimation.

Stylized dance must retain the nature and flavor of folklore while respecting the "demands of the stage": to create space, to accentuate movement, to have different parts fit into the whole.

Music 
La Argentina was the first to use music for Spanish dance of the great contemporary composers such as Isaac Albéniz, de Falla, Granados and Turina. The musical monuments of these four composers demanded broad choral movements that folklore did not possess. Taking as their base the guitar's melodic micro-universe, and influenced by foreign (especially Russian and French) composition styles, they considerably widened their musical palette. She also elicited scores from the young composers of her country such as Ernesto Halffter, Óscar Esplá, and Duran.

Great artists accompanied her on the piano. In 1926, Joaquin Nin, pianist and composer arranged many popular songs and Amparo Navaro, née Iturbi, sister of José Iturbi.
Carmencita Perez played in 1926 and 1929–30; Miguel Berdion in late 1929 and 1930, and in 1931 in New York. Luis Galve was her accompanist from 27 March 1931 until the end.

La Argentina used any music that suited her temperament.

Castanets 
Argentina began to use castanets at three or four years old.

Argentina modified the design of castanets to obtain more satisfying tones. Many Spanish artists adopted her musical notation for castanets.

Recital format
Argentina was also the first to inaugurate the recital format, performing her own choreography for concerts in which she was alone on stage, accompanied simply by a pianist, occasionally by a guitarist, especially for the flamenco dances. Her guitarist throughout was Salvador Ballesteros, a family friend. She did not succeed all at once. She first performed dances in variety programmes, then in pieces with orchestral music; later on in dances where less importance was accorded the orchestra. Her first shows in 1925 during a European tour and in the South of France were shared with Joaquin Nin the composer and soloist, the singer Alicita Felici, with Mme Ginesty-Brisson at the piano, or with the opera singer Dolores de Silvera. The same programme took place at the Salle Gaveau, in Paris, on January 10, 1926. It was in Berlin, on October 15, 1926, that she gave her first solo recital with Carmencita Perez as accompanist. At the end of October of the same year, she gave the same performance in Stockholm, then at the Salle Gaveau in Paris. From then on, she retained the same format:

1927: Salle Gaveau, Théâtre Femina
1928: Salle Pleyel
1929: Imperial theatre in Tokyo (26-30 January)  
1929: Théâtre des Champs-Elysées
1933: On December 3, first recital at the Paris Opera
1934: Gala at the Opera, and recital at the Opéra-Comique
1936: Springtime saw her in Cannes where the kings of Sweden and Denmark applauded her; in May she returned to Paris and, except for her own ballets, always performed alone on stage with ever-increasing triumph around the world. Argentina was also the first artist of such fame to give recitals at inexpensive prices that were within everybody's range, at the old Trocadéro which held more than five thousand seats. The success of these popular shows was sheer madness. She was obliged to renew the experience several times a season as it had become a tradition expected by all Parisians, who jammed the box-offices, the thousands of seats available being sold out in a single day.

Main creations 

1. Concert dances

1912 El Garrotin, based on a popular air. La Corrida, music by Valverde (taken from choreographies created in 1910 for the opérette l’Amour en Espagne  Tango Andalou, music by Ballesteros.

1916 Danse des Yeux verts, music specially composed by Granados.

Between 1916 and 1921: Habanera, music by Pablo de Sarasate. Cordoba, music by Albeniz. Danza V, music by Granados.

1921 Sevilla, music by Albeniz. Serenata, music by Malats. Sérénade Andalouse, music by C. Ruecker.

1925 Danse du Feu, music by Manuel de Falla. Andalouse Sentimentale, music by Turina. Boléro Classique, music by Iradier. Bohémiene, based on a popular air. Seguidilla (without music).

1926 Mexicaine, based on a popular air. Ciel de Cuba, based on a popular air.

1927 Valencia, music by C. Ruecker. Chaconne, music by Albeniz.

1928  Serenata Andaluza, music by Manuel de Falla. Jota Valenciana, music by Granados. Danse Gitane, music by Infante. Lagerterana, music by Guerrero.

1929 la vie brève, music by de Falla. Carinosa, popular music from the Philippines. Jota Aragonesa, music by de Falla.

1930 Goyescas, music by Granados. Danse Ibérienne, music specially composed by Joaquin Nin. Danse de la Meunière, music by de Falla.

1932 Almeria, music by Albeniz. La Romeria de los Cornudos, music by Pittaluga (The Shawl Dance - a dance from Granada). Puerta de Tierra, music by Albeniz. Danse du Meunier, music by de Falla. Légende, music by Albeniz. Charrada, popular music from Salamanca. Malaguena, music by Albeniz. Castilla, music by Albeniz, « Matid 1 800 ». Cuba, music by Albeniz.
Alegrias, music by Ballesteros.

1933 Zapataedo, music by Granados. Tientos, music by Infante.

1934 Sacra-Monte, music by Turina. Esquisse Gitane, music by Infante. La Fregona, music by Vives. Suite Argentine, based on a popular air (Condicion-Bailecito - Zamba). Suite Andalouse, based on popular airs (Sevillanas-Peteneras - Bulerias).

1936 1935 Fandango, music by Turina. Polo Gitano, music by Breton. La Firmeza, based on Argentinian popular music, becoming the last dance in the Suite Argentine.

2. Ballets

1925 L’Amour Sorcier, music by Manuel de Falla.

1927 El Fandango de Candi, music by Duran. Argentina successively expressed feminine shrewdness, thwarted love, tenderness, wearing a pink costume with cubist flounces cut into scallops.

1927 Au coeur de Seville, cuadro flamenco based on a popular air.

1928 Sonatine, music by Ernesto Halffter. This ballet, a mixture of Old France and Castilla, made Spanish courtly dancing come to life again. With delightful touch, Argentina introduces a shepherdess on stage, gliding and pirouetting imperceptibly.

1928 Le Contrebandier, music by Óscar Esplá, where the future Empress Eugénie meets Prosper Mérimée and where the countess of Teba saves a smuggler who is pursued by two opérette gendarmes.

1928 Juerga, music by Julien Bautista. Scenes of popular life in Madrid around 1 885 : returning from a popular festival, young people from good families in search of pleasure mingle with common folk, and give themselves to unrestrained jollity : turmoil, dancing, and colourful to-ing and fro-ing.

1929 Triana, music by Albeniz. Lovers' tiffs during the Corpus Christi in Sevilla.

See also
 List of dancers

Notes

Further reading 
 Suzanne F. Cordelier: La vie brève de la Argentina. Paris 1936
 Monique Paravicini (ed.): Argentina. Gilberte Cournand, Paris 1956
 Argentina. Bienal de Arte Flamenco (V el Baile). Sevilla 1988
 Ministerio de Cultura (ed.): Homenaje en su Centenario 1890-1990 Antonia Mercé 'La Argentina'''. Madrid 1990
 Suzanne de Soye: Toi qui dansais, (you danced and danced) Argentina. Paris 1993
 Carlos Manso: La Argentina, fue Antonia Mercé. Buenos Aires 1993
 Ria Schneider (ed.): Argentina. Antonia Mercé. Kastagnettenstücke, entstanden 1912-1936. IGkK, Köln 1993
 Brygida M. Ochaim, Claudia Balk: Varieté-Tänzerinnen um 1900. Vom Sinnenrausch zur Tanzmoderne, Ausstellung des Deutschen Theatermuseums München 23.10.1998–17.1.1999.'', Stroemfeld, Frankfurt/M. 1998,

External links

La Argentina's biography
Short Biography
Tarot & Dance: The Dancing Queens, Antonia Merce, La Argentina, Queen of Coins(c) Cheryl Lynne Bradley 2003] at TarotCanada.tripod.com La Argentina
Legado de Antonia Mercé La Argentina en la Fundación Juan March(Spanish).
Archive of Antonia Mercé La Argentina, Fundación Juan March-Madrid(English).

1890 births
1936 deaths
Argentine female dancers
Argentine people of Spanish descent
Flamenco dancers
People from Buenos Aires
Argentine emigrants to Spain